The Iranian Hospital in Dubai is located on the Al Wasl Road in Jumeirah. Inaugurated on 14 April 1972, it was built by and is affiliated to the Iranian Red Crescent Society, and is the oldest known provider of healthcare services in Dubai. Most of the hospital's medical staff are from the Iranian community in the UAE. It is a private hospital and comes under Dubai Health Authority (DHA).

The hospital building features an exterior of blue tilework inspired by Persian architecture, similar to the Iranian Mosque located across the road. The Iranian consulate is also nearby.

Background
Construction on the hospital began in 1970 on land donated to the Iranian Red Crescent Society (Red Lion and Sun Society) by Sheikh Rashid Bin Saeed Al Maktoum. The Iranian Hospital is accredited by Accreditation Canada and has received a Qmentum International Platinum rating from the body. It has the capability to serve over 2500 outpatients per day.

In October 2014, the hospital opened a new facility for sub-specialty health care services. Amenities of the new extension include:
 220 premium in-patient bed
 25 sub-specialty clinics
 A gastro-endoscopy center
 A diagnostic-imaging center 
 10 operation rooms equipped with technology for laparoscopic and minimally invasive surgery
 A fully automated advanced laboratory
 The 1st cytogenetic and DNA diagnostic lab in the region

Out-patient clinics and departments
General Physicians Clinics
Internal Medicine Specialty and Sub-Specialty Clinics including:
 Infectious Disease
 Neurology
 Neuro-Lab Center
 Endocrinology
 Pulmonary
 Rheumatology
 Digestive System
 Endoscopy
Surgical:
 Orthopedic 
 Urology
 Pediatric
 Neurosurgery
 ENT
Ophthalmology:
 Optical Laser Department
 OCT
Cosmetic and Aesthetic:
 Cosmetic and Aesthetic Surgery
 Dermatology Specialty and Sub-Specialty
 Skin Laser Center
 Follicular Transplantation Center
 Slimming and Body Contouring Unit
Pediatric:
 General Pediatrics
 Neonatal
 Neonate Screening Tests
 Vaccination
 Pediatric Pulmonology
 Pediatric Hematology
 Pediatric Gastroenterology
 Pediatric Endocrinology
 Pediatric and Neonatal Surgery
Women Personalized Specialty Services:
 Gynecology
 Obstetrics
 NST
 Colposcopy
 Breast Clinic
Cardiology:
 Cardiology
 Echocardiography
 Exercise Test
 ECG
 Holter Monitoring
Psychiatry:
 General Psychiatric Services
 Child and Adolescent Psychiatry
 Psychology Services and Consultations
 Repetitive Transcranial Magnetic Stimulation Therapy
Dentistry:
 General Dentistry
 Orthodontics
 Dental Implantation

In-patient services
 24 Hour Emergency Department Services
 ICU
 CCU
 Internal Medicine Ward
 Global Healthcare Services Department for medical tourists
 Male and Female Surgical Wards
 Day Care Surgery Wards
 Operation Theater
 Cath-Lab
 Gynecology and Obstetrics Ward
 Labor Ward
 Neonatal ICU
 Pediatric Ward
 Pediatric ICU

Awards
Iranian Hospital was presented with an Honorable Mention award at the Dubai Police Golden Jubilee for its cooperation with the department.

See also

 List of hospitals in Dubai
 Iranian Club, Dubai

References

External links
 

Hospital buildings completed in 1972
Hospitals established in 1972
Hospitals in Dubai
Iran–United Arab Emirates relations
Iranian diaspora in the United Arab Emirates
1972 establishments in the United Arab Emirates